Lidingö Cemetery is a cemetery located adjacent to Lidingö Church in Stockholm County, Sweden. It is centrally located on the island of Lidingö at an elevation adjacent to Kyrkviken's southern shore. South-west of the church is Hersbyholm and south on the other side of Ekholmsnäsvägen is one of Lidingö's well-known townhouse areas, Hersby Gärde.

History
Lidingö Church appears for the first time on a map from 1661. Also marked on the map are some of the farms and dwellings that were on the island at that time. Around the church and the cemetery an arched wall was built in 1755, which is partly preserved. The wreath of lime trees around the oldest part of the cemetery was planted around 1810. The cemetery was expanded south and east in 1854 and was then supplemented with new rows of lime trees. The cemetery continued to expand in turns both south and east in 1905 and in 1909. Then the so-called Kyrkbacken was added. From 1945 to 1952, the areas called Bakom kolumbariet ("Behind the Columbarium"), De övre terrasserna ("The Upper Terraces") and Halvmånen ("The Crescent") were built. All are located south of the columbarium. In 1952, the newer parts of the cemetery and the columbarium were inaugurated. In 1964, the first stage of the Åsen area was built, designed by Inger Wedborn. In 1965 the Nedanför kranskullen area was designed by Inger Wedborn. Wedborn also drew up the basic proposals for the continued eastward expansion, which for some reason later changed. The areas east and north were inaugurated in turns during the 1970s and 1980s. The memorial grove in the middle of the cemetery was built in 1974 and was adorned with the statue Ängel ("Angel") by Carl Milles in 1999. The most recently added areas are the Vilokullen and the block north of Norra gångsvägen towards Kyrkviken. These were inaugurated during the 1990s and 2000s.

Notable burials

 Hans Alfredson
 Gert Bonnier
 Joakim Bonnier
 Irja Browallius
 Gustaf Dalén
 Tage Danielsson
 Siri Derkert
 Thore Ehrling
 Jarl Hjalmarson
 Ernst-Hugo Järegård
 Anna Lang
 Ingrid Lang-Fagerström
 Pär Lagerkvist
 Bertil Malmberg
 Jan Olof Olsson
 Agneta Prytz
 Povel Ramel
 Birgitta Valberg
 Paul Petter Waldenström
 Stig Westerberg
 Gerald Mohr

Gallery, gravestones

See also
 Lidingö Municipality

References

External links

 Lidingö Parish website 

Lidingö Municipality
Cemeteries in Sweden
Buildings and structures in Stockholm County